Visa requirements for Trinidad and Tobago citizens are administrative entry restrictions by the authorities of other states placed on citizens of Trinidad and Tobago. As of 7 April 2020, Trinidad and Tobago citizens had visa-free or visa on arrival access to 150 countries and territories, ranking the Trinidad and Tobago passport 30th in terms of travel freedom according to the Henley Passport Index. As a member of CARICOM, Trinidad and Tobago passport holders that are skilled nationals with a CSME Certificate have access to freedom of movement in all CARICOM full member states (except The Bahamas and Haiti).

Trinidad and Tobago signed a mutual visa waiver agreement with Schengen Area countries on 28 May 2015 allowing their citizens to travel visa free to all Schengen states as well as associated countries and some territories.

Visa requirement map

Visa requirements 
Visa requirements for holders of normal passports traveling for tourist purposes are as follow:

Dependent, Disputed, or Restricted territories
Unrecognized or partially recognized countries

Dependent and autonomous territories

Other territories

See also

Visa policy of Trinidad and Tobago
Trinidad and Tobago passport

Notes

References

Trinidad and Tobago
Foreign relations of Trinidad and Tobago